The spindle elimia (Elimia capillaris) is a species of freshwater snails with an operculum, aquatic gastropod mollusks in the family Pleuroceridae. This species is endemic to the United States.

References 

Molluscs of the United States
Elimia
Gastropods described in 1861
Taxonomy articles created by Polbot
Taxa named by Isaac Lea